Gun City is a 2018 Spanish-French thriller film directed by Dani de la Torre and written by Patxi Amezcua. Set in 1921 Barcelona, the plot displays anarchist struggle and police brutality as a backdrop. The cast features Luis Tosar, Michelle Jenner, Vicente Romero, Manolo Solo, Paco Tous, Jaime Lorente, Adriana Torrebejano and Ernesto Alterio.

Plot
In Barcelona, 1921, tension is high between the police and local anarchists. A military train has been robbed and its cargo stolen. The police try to find those responsible and receive support from agent Aníbal Uriarte, who was sent from Madrid. The detectives resort to brutal methods, including murder. They interrogate the train driver and whom they suspect is part of the robbery before murdering him.

Meanwhile, the center of the city hosts many protests against the unfair treatment of workers and women that are forcibly repressed by the police. A dodgy bar owner seems to be involved in the criminal business. It is revealed that the corrupt police are on his payroll. In broad daylight, an attack on them is committed that ends up being somewhat good for them.

The trail leads Uriarte to a group of radical anarchists who start the war on police brutality and cause panic and chaos in the city. Between the mafia and the unions – represented by the certain Salvador Ortiz and his feminist daughter Sara – the agent tries to find a compromise and to prevent a possible premeditated coup – and further massacres – by the military, before a civil war breaks out.

Cast

Production
In Autumn 2017, Playtime was announced to co-produce and to handle international sales on Gun City, a period Spanish thriller, directed by Dani de la Torre and produced by Spain's Vaca Films Studio and Atresmedia Cine/La Ley del Plomo with Playtime Prods. Veteran Spanish actor Luis Tosar and up-and-comer Michelle Jenner starred. Production budget was 5 million euros ($5.89 million). The film was shot in locations of Barcelona and Galicia (including the city of A Coruña and Monforte de Lemos).

Inaccuracies
The firearms portrayed in the film are anachronistic for the year in which the film takes place, 1921. The Spanish soldiers in the beginning of the film are seen carrying M1 Garands and M1 Carbines, first issued to United States military in the late 1930s and early 1940s. The stolen weapons consist of Thompson submachine guns. which were first introduced in 1921 and would likely not have been available in large quantities at the time. Additionally the character Sara carries a Walther PP during the bank robbery, which was not introduced until 1935.

Release 
The film screened at the 51st Sitges Film Festival on 5 October 2018. Distributed by Hispano FoxFilm, it was theatrically released in Spain on 11 October 2018.

The film was released on 31 October 2018 by Netflix.

Accolades

|-
| rowspan = "24" align = "center" | 2019 || rowspan = "3" | 11th Gaudí Awards || Best Costume Design || Clara Bilbao ||  || rowspan = "3" | 
|-
| Best Visual Effects || Félix Bergés, Lluís Rivera || 
|-
| Best Makeup and Hairstyles || Noe Montes, Raquel Fidalgo || 
|-
| rowspan = "6" | 33rd Goya Awards || Best Original Score || Manuel Riveiro, Xavi Font ||  || rowspan = "6" | 
|-
| Best Cinematography || Josu Incháustegui || 
|-
| Best Makeup and Hairstyles || Raquel Fidalgo, Noé Montes, Alberto Hortas || 
|-
| Best Art Direction || Juan Pedro de Gaspar || 
|-
| Best Special Effects || Lluís Rivera, Félix Bergés || 
|-
| Best Costume Design || Clara Bilbao || 
|-
| rowspan = "15" | 17th Mestre Mateo Awards || colspan = "2" | Best Film ||  || rowspan = "15" | 
|-
| Best Director || Dani de la Torre || 
|-
| Best Screenplay || || 
|-
| Best Actress || Michelle Jenner || 
|-
| Best Actor || Luis Tosar || 
|-
| Best Supporting Actress || Adriana Torrebejano || 
|-
| Best Supporting Actor ||Ernesto Alterio || 
|-
| Best Cinematography || || 
|-
| Best Art Direction || Juan Pedro de Gaspar || 
|-
| Best Production Supervision || María Liaño || 
|-
| Best Makeup and Hairstyles || Raquel Hidalgo, Noé Montes || 
|-
| Best Editing || Jorge Coira || 
|-
| Best Original Score || Manu Riveiro, Xavi Font || 
|-
| Best Sound || David Machado, James Muñoz, José Antonio Manovel || 
|-
| Best Costume Design || Clara Bilbao || 
|}

See also 
 List of Spanish films of 2018

References

External links
  on Netflix
 

2018 films
2018 thriller films
2010s Spanish-language films
Spanish thriller films
Films set in 1921
Films set in Barcelona
Films about anarchism
Vaca Films films
Atresmedia Cine films
Films shot in Barcelona
Films shot in Galicia (Spain)
2010s Spanish films